Gulab Kothari is an Indian author, and editor-in-chief of Rajasthan Patrika. Kothari is known for his contributions to Vedic Studies and was conferred with the Moortidevi Award in 2011, for his book Mein Hi Radha, Mein Hi Krishna.

Education 

Kothari received D. Litt. in philosophy from Intercultural Open University (IOU) in 2002. In March 2004, Kothari was nominated as the newly set-up Pandit Madhusudan Ojha chair  at the University of Rajasthan to promote research on Vedas, by IOU. In August 2014, Kothari was awarded PhD in administration from Universidad Central de Nicaragrua (UCN) and Universidad Azteca (UA).

Awards and recognition 

 Moorthidevi Award (2011)
 Bhartendu Harishchandra Award (2000)
 Govt. of India's National Unity Award (1993)
 Raja Ram Mohan Roy Award (2019)

References 

Journalists from Rajasthan
Hindi-language writers
Living people
Year of birth missing (living people)
Recipients of the Moortidevi Award